Expeditions is a collection of poetry by Margaret Atwood, published in 1966.

1966 poetry books
Poetry by Margaret Atwood
Canadian poetry collections